James R. Burn, Jr. is an American attorney and martial arts instructor. Over a 22-year period of public service, he has served as mayor of Millvale Borough in Allegheny County, Allegheny County Council Chairman of the Allegheny County Democratic Committee and the Pennsylvania Democratic Party.

Burn graduated from Duquesne University in 1985 and obtained his J.D. at the University of Dayton in 1988, where he was president of the Student Bar Association and the Phi Delta Phi fraternity.

Burn was mayor of Millvale, Pennsylvania from 1994 to 2005 and served on the Allegheny County Council from 2006 to 2013, with a term as its president in 2011. He has chaired the Millvale Democratic Committee, Allegheny County Democratic Committee, and the Pennsylvania Democratic Party, where he served a five-year term.

Burn is reported to be considering a campaign for governor in 2018.

References

Living people
Pennsylvania Democratic Party chairs
Pennsylvania Democrats
Year of birth missing (living people)